The 2012 OEC Taipei WTA Ladies Open was a professional tennis tournament played on indoor carpet courts. It was the fifth edition of the tournament and the first event in the new 2012 WTA 125s. It took place in Taipei, Taiwan between 29 October and 4 November 2012.

WTA entrants

Seeds

 1 Rankings are as of October 22, 2012.

Other entrants
The following players received wildcards into the singles main draw:
  Chan Chin-wei
  Chan Hao-ching
  Juan Ting-fei
  Lee Ya-hsuan
  Peng Shuai

The following players received entry from the qualifying draw:
  Hsu Wen-hsin
  Lee Hua-chen
  Alexandra Stevenson
  Zhang Ling

Champions

Singles

 Kristina Mladenovic def.  Chang Kai-chen, 6–4, 6–3

Doubles

 Chan Hao-ching /  Kristina Mladenovic def.  Chang Kai-chen /  Olga Govortsova, 5–7, 6–2, [10–8]

References

External links
Official Website

OEC Taipei WTA Ladies Open
OEC Taipei WTA Ladies Open
Taipei WTA Ladies Open
2012 in Taiwanese tennis